Hilah Johnson is an American chef, Internet personality, and author from Austin, Texas. She is best known for her YouTube series Hilah Cooking.

Early life
Johnson grew up in Hudson Bend, Texas, a suburb of Austin near Lake Travis. Her father was descended from Austin's famed Old Three Hundred, and her mother's ancestors included those who helped build the Republic of Texas (1836–45). When Johnson was seven, she started cooking, occasionally making dishes for herself, her parents, and her brother.

Upon reaching adulthood, she attended the University of Massachusetts Boston (UMass Boston), where she studied Biology. After a year at UMass Boston, she transferred to the University of Texas in Austin, where she finished with a degree in Botany. After college, she was part of a rock band called The Hot As Shits, and she also joined an improv troupe in Austin called Big ol’ Tire Fire. There, she met a burgeoning filmmaker named Christopher Sharpe.

Over the next few years, Johnson and Sharpe began collaborating on several projects. They worked together on the short film Freerange Asshole; she had an acting role and served as costume designer, while he worked behind the scenes as a sound mixer. They also worked together on an indie horror flick which he directed and in which she starred, though the film was never finished. In 2010, they decided to focus on producing Web content.

Hilah Cooking
Johnson stars in and is co-producer (along with Sharpe) of, the YouTube series Hilah Cooking. On the show, she guides viewers through the steps of cooking various homemade dishes, using humor along the way. The show premiered in January 2010, and by 2012, the show was so successful, that she was able to quit her day job as a dental hygienist.

In 2011, the show had approximately two thousand subscribers. Two years later, it had increased to 100,000, and by 2015, that number was nearly 250,000.

Other work
The success of Hilah Cooking had led to a spin-off series, Hilah's Texas Kitchen, seen on Tastemade. On this show, Johnson travels to eateries all over the state of Texas to sample various Texas cuisine, as prepared by expert chefs. She then shows viewers an easy way to prepare these dishes themselves.

In addition to her online shows, Johnson has also written five books on cooking. In 2017, she debuted a new podcast, Hilah's Happy Hour.

Awards and competitions
In 2011, Johnson participated in the YouTube Next Chef competition, which she won. She was also featured in the Star Power tournament on the 33rd season of Food Network's Chopped, in 2017. She finished third on the semi-final episode featuring Internet stars.

Personal life
In 2011, Johnson married her long-time collaborator Sharpe. In October 2014, they welcomed the arrival of their son Flint. The three of them moved to Los Angeles in 2015. Together, Johnson and Sharpe serve on the board of the charitable organization GiveBackLA, where they are in charge of social media.

Publications
 Learn to Cook; Hilah Cooking, 2nd edition (2012) [original publication 2011], 
 The Breakfast Taco Book; Hilah Cooking, 2nd edition (2013) [original publication 2011], 
 Cavelady Cooking; Hilah Cooking (2012), 
 Holiday Cookies; Hilah Cooking (2012), 
 Slow Cooker Recipes; Hilah Cooking (2014),

References

External links 

 
 

American chefs
American cookbook writers
American film actresses
American women bloggers
American bloggers
Living people
Participants in American reality television series
People from Austin, Texas
People from Travis County, Texas
University of Massachusetts Boston alumni
University of Texas at Austin College of Natural Sciences alumni
American women non-fiction writers
21st-century American non-fiction writers
Year of birth missing (living people)
YouTubers from Texas
21st-century American actresses